Bokšić may refer to:

 Bokšić, Vukovar-Srijem County, a village near Tompojevci, Croatia
 Bokšić, Osijek-Baranja County, a village near Đurđenovac, Croatia
 Bokšić, Kosovo, a village near Klina
 Alen Bokšić, Croatian football player